Wyndham is a village located  south of Sydney, on the far south coast of New South Wales, Australia in the Bega Valley Shire.

Neighboring towns are Bega, Merimbula, Pambula, Candelo and Bombala.

Facilities
Wyndham General Store (also Post Office, service station, cafe), Wyndham primary school, Wyndham School of Arts Hall, Uniting Church Hall, Sports Ground, Stringy bark centre, Ultraviolet treated water.

Surrounds
Wyndham has a stunning backdrop of Jingera rock, a sheer granite rock face.

Events
School of Arts Hall Wyndham Village Markets, annual art show, annual ballet performance, ballet lessons

Stringy Bark Centre yoga classes, massage and natural therapies

Wyndham Village Markets
Wyndham Village Markets are held on the fourth Sunday of each month in the School Of Arts Hall, with a range of crafts, foods, and often tools.

Notes and references

See also
 Bega, New South Wales

External links
 Bega Community Website
 Info on local pub

Towns in New South Wales
Towns in the South Coast (New South Wales)
Bega Valley Shire